Aguon is a surname. Notable people with the surname include:

Frank Aguon (born 1966), Guamanian politician
John P. Aguon, Guamanian politician
Katherine B. Aguon, Guamanian educator and politician.

See also
Agron (surname)

Surnames of Oceanian origin